Brenda Bruce OBE (7 July 1919 – 19 February 1996) was an English actress. She was focused on the theatre, radio, film and television.

Career
Bruce was born in Prestwich, Lancashire in 1919, and started her acting career as a teenager on stage as a chorus girl. She appeared with the Birmingham Repertory Company (1936–39) and was a long-time actress with the Royal Shakespeare Company (RSC). She was the RSC's resident Mistress Page in The Merry Wives of Windsor, playing the role in 1964, 1968, 1975 and 1995. She appeared as Irma in the RSC's production of Jean Genet's The Balcony in 1971. In the 1950s she appeared on television in many dramas, and in a chat show Rich and Rich with her husband. She starred as Winnie in the 1962 British premiere of Samuel Beckett's Happy Days, and in 1977 as Lucilla Edith Cavell Teatime in Murder Most English.

Bruce played Aunt Dahlia in the 1990s production of Jeeves and Wooster with Stephen Fry and Hugh Laurie. Other roles include Tilda in the Doctor Who story "Paradise Towers", Bea in the rag trade drama Connie and Granny Grogan in The Riff Raff Element. Among her film roles were Peeping Tom, where she played a prostitute murdered in the opening scene, and in 1964, she played Mary Lewis in Nightmare. In 1994, she starred in Honey for Tea, a short-lived sitcom.

Personal life
She was married and widowed twice, first to television personality Roy Rich, with whom she had two daughters, and second to actor Clement McCallin, with whom she adopted a son. McCallin died in 1977.

Death
She died in London on 19 February 1996 from undisclosed causes, aged 76.

Awards
In 1962 she was given the Society of Film and Television Arts Television Awards 1962.
She was named Best Actress in 1963 by BAFTA British Academy Television Award for Best Actress.
She was awarded an OBE in the 1985 New Year Honours.

Theatre

Radio

TV and filmography

References

External links

Performances in the Theatre Archive University of Bristol
Brenda Bruce filmography, timeout.com

1919 births
1996 deaths
20th-century English actresses
Actresses from Manchester
Best Actress BAFTA Award (television) winners
English film actresses
English radio actresses
English stage actresses
English television actresses
Officers of the Order of the British Empire
People from Prestwich
Royal Shakespeare Company members
20th-century British businesspeople